George Augustus Jenks (March 26, 1836 – February 10, 1908) was a politician from Pennsylvania.  He served in Congress and as Solicitor General of the United States.

Life and career
George Jenks was born in Punxsutawney, Pennsylvania, on March 26, 1836. He graduated from Jefferson College (now Washington & Jefferson College) in Canonsburg, Pennsylvania, in 1858. He was a member of Phi Kappa Psi.

After college, he married Mary A. Mabon, and they had one daughter, Emma Jenks (1862-1926), who married Benjamin F. Shively. Jenks first worked as a lawyer before beginning a career as a judge and politician.

Congress
He served as a Congressman for Pennsylvania from 1875 to 1877, in the 44th Congress. He served as chairman of the United States House Committee on Invalid Pensions during the Forty-fourth Congress. He was also one of the managers appointed by the House of Representatives in 1876 to conduct the impeachment proceedings against William W. Belknap, ex-Secretary of War.

Later career and death
Following his tenure in Congress, Jenks was nominated by the Democrats for judge of the Supreme Court of Pennsylvania in 1880. He was defeated by Henry Green, of Easton, Pennsylvania. He was later selected as U.S. Assistant Secretary of Interior; a position which he held from 1885 to 1886.

From 1886 to 1889 Jenks served as United States Solicitor General, during President Grover Cleveland’s first term. He was the Democratic nominee for governorship of Pennsylvania in 1898, as well as the Democratic nominee in the 1899 United States Senate election in Pennsylvania, during the Quay deadlock .

Jenks's son-in-law (husband of his daughter, Laura) was Benjamin Shively, a U.S. Senator from Indiana.

Jenks died February 10, 1908, at his home in Brookville, Pennsylvania.

References

Sources

The Political Graveyard

1836 births
1908 deaths
People from Punxsutawney, Pennsylvania
Democratic Party members of the United States House of Representatives from Pennsylvania
Pennsylvania lawyers
Washington & Jefferson College alumni
United States Solicitors General
19th-century American politicians